Carloggas is a hamlet in the parish of Mawgan-in-Pydar, Cornwall, England.

There is also a hamlet in the parish of St Stephen-in-Brannel called Carloggas.

References

Hamlets in Cornwall